Adnan Hadzic (born 8 March 1999) is a Norwegian footballer who plays as a midfielder for SønderjyskE.

Career
Hadzic played for Ørn-Horten between 2015 and 2017, before joining Start in the summer of 2017. He made his Eliteserien debut in March 2018 against Tromsø, coming off the bench to substitute Isaac Twum in a 4–1 win.

On 1 August 2020, Hadzic moved to Sandnes Ulf on loan. On 11 September, the move was made permanent, and he signed a contract until December 2022.

On 13 August 2021, Hadzic signed a contract with Fredrikstad, joining them on a deal until 31 December 2024. However, he was bought free by newly relegated Danish 1st Division club SønderjyskE on 3 August 2022, signing a deal until June 2026.

Career statistics

Club

References

1999 births
Living people
Norwegian footballers
Norwegian expatriate footballers
People from Horten
Norway youth international footballers
Association football defenders
FK Ørn-Horten players
IK Start players
Sandnes Ulf players
Fredrikstad FK players
SønderjyskE Fodbold players
Eliteserien players
Norwegian First Division players
Sportspeople from Vestfold og Telemark
Norwegian expatriate sportspeople in Denmark
Expatriate men's footballers in Denmark